Shuhrat Mirkholdirshoev (born 5 March 1982), is a former Uzbek professional footballer. He won the IFFHS World's Most Effective Top Division Goal Scorer of the Year in 2004.

Club career
Mirkholdirshoev played for different clubs in his career. He is 3rd top scoring player after Anvar Berdiev and Zafar Kholmurodov in League matches with 195 goals, entering Gennadi Krasnitsky club top scorer's club. Totally he scored 222 goals in all competitions (as of 7 November 2014).

International career
He made his debut in the national team on 1 September 2000 and played 3 matches.

Honours

Club
Nasaf Qarshi
 Uzbek League runner-up: 2011
 Uzbek Cup runner-up: 2011

Individual
 Uzbek League Top Scorer (2): 2003, 2004
 Gennadi Krasnitsky club: 222 goals
 IFFHS World's Most Effective Top Division Goal Scorer of the Year (1): 2004

External links

1982 births
Living people
Uzbekistani footballers
Uzbekistan international footballers
Association football forwards
Footballers at the 2002 Asian Games
Asian Games competitors for Uzbekistan
Uzbekistan Super League players
FK Mash'al Mubarek players